This is a list of notable Gaud Saraswat Brahmins.

Spiritual heads 
 Sukrathindra Thirtha of Kashi Math.
 Sudhindra Thirtha (Kashi Math), 20th Swamiji Of Kashi Math.
 Sadyojat Shankarashram Swamiji of Chitrapur Math
 Samyamindra Thirtha Swamiji of Kashi Math
 Shrimad Vidyadhiraj Teerth Swamiji former head of Gokarna Math
 Shrimad Vidhyadhish Teerth Swamiji Swamiji of Gokarna Math

Politicians
Kashinath Trimbak Telang (1850–1893) - judge, politician, writer and educationalist
N. G. Chandavarkar (1855–1923) - judge, politician and social reformer
Manohar Parrikar (1955–2019) -Ex Defence Minister of India, and Chief Minister of Goa for multiple term.
Suresh Prabhu, Ex Minister of Railways Commerce & Industry and Civil Aviation, former chairman of Saraswat Bank

Writers and academics

Yashwant Vithoba Chittal (1928-2014) - Kannada fiction writer
Manjeshwar Govinda Pai (1883 – 1963)- Kannada poet, and recipient Madras state Rashtrakavi award. 
Milind Chittal - Indian classical vocalist. 
Gangadhar Vithoba Chittal (1923–1987) - Kannada poet and recipient of Karnataka Sahitya Academy award. 
R.G. Bhandarkar (1837–1925) - orientalist, and social reformer
Vijay Tendulkar (1928–2008) - playwright, screenplay writer and journalist
Dharmananda Damodar Kosambi (1876–1947) - scholar of Buddhism and Pali language
Damodar Dharmananda Kosambi (1907–1966) - polymath
Meera Kosambi (1939–2015) - writer and sociologist. Daughter of Damodar Dharmananda Kosambi
Jayanth Kaikini

Film actors and directors
Guru Dutt (1925–1964) - Hindi film actor and director
Deepika Padukone

Businessmen 
 T. V. Mohandas Pai

See also 

Gaud Saraswat Brahmin temples in Kerala

References 

Goud Saraswat Brahmin